The Pennsylvania Museum and School of Industrial Art (PMSIA), also referred to as the School of Applied Art, was chartered by the Commonwealth of Pennsylvania on February 26, 1876, as both a museum and teaching institution. This was in response to the Centennial International Exhibition held in Philadelphia that year.

Classes began in Fall 1877, in a building at 312 North Broad Street, and soon moved into the old Franklin Institute (now the Philadelphia History Museum), at 15 South 7th Street.  

In 1893 PMSIA acquired a complex of buildings at Broad & Pine, vacated by the Pennsylvania Institution for the Deaf and Dumb when they moved to Germantown.   

In 1964, following a series of name changes, the two institutions split: the museum became the Philadelphia Museum of Art, and the school became the Philadelphia College of Art. After further name changes the school has become the University of the Arts.  University of the Arts has retained the property at 320 S. Broad Street.

Notable people 

The first president of PMSIA was Coleman Sellers II (1827–1907). The first principal of the school was Leslie W. Miller (1848-1931), who remained there for forty years, 1880 through 1920.

Notable alumni include Meta Vaux Warrick Fuller, Charles Sheeler, Allan Randall Freelon, Samuel Yellin, Irving Penn, the Brothers Quay, Henry Clarence Pitz, Jerry Pinkney, Jayson Musson, Paul F. Keene Jr., Harold Knerr, Wharton Esherick, Frederick Meyer, Julian Abele and Aliki Brandenberg.

References

External links

 University of the Arts website
 University of the Arts Name Changes
 University of the Arts Notable Alumni
Philadelphia Museum of Art Web Site
 Philadelphia Museum of Art: History

Museums in Philadelphia
Defunct private universities and colleges in Pennsylvania
Educational institutions established in 1876
1876 establishments in Pennsylvania